German submarine U-379 was a Type VIIC U-boat built for Nazi Germany's Kriegsmarine for service during World War II.
She was laid down on 27 May 1940 by Howaldtswerke, Kiel as yard number 10, launched on 15 October 1941 and commissioned on 29 November 1941 under Kapitänleutnant Paul-Hugo Kettner.

Design
German Type VIIC submarines were preceded by the shorter Type VIIB submarines. U-379 had a displacement of  when at the surface and  while submerged. She had two shafts and two  propellers.

U-379 was fitted with five  torpedo tubes (four fitted at the bow and one at the stern), fourteen torpedoes, one  SK C/35 naval gun, 220 rounds, and a  C/30 anti-aircraft gun. The boat had a complement of between forty-four and sixty.

Service history
The boat's career began with training at 8th U-boat Flotilla on 29 November 1941, followed by active service on 1 July 1942 as part of the 1st Flotilla for the remainder of her short career.

Convoy SC 94
On the calm and sunny afternoon of 8 August 1942, U-379 attacked and sunk two merchant ships of Convoy SC 94, which was Eastbound from Nova Scotia to Liverpool, first US freighter Kaimoku, swiftly followed by the British freighter Anneberg.

However, later the same day, U-379 was spotted on the surface together with  exchanging information. RN corvette  gave chase firing her guns at the surfaced U-boat as she desperately dived.  joined HMS Dianthus making a thorough ASDIC sweep but found nothing, so HMCS Chilliwack rejoined the convoy.

HMS Dianthus remained in the area and tried one last sweep and spotted U-379 again on the surface in the darkness attempting to slink away. She fired off a spread of depth charges forcing the now submerged U-boat to the surface. Dianthus opened up with all her guns and prepared to ram, catching the U-boat a glancing blow forward of the conning tower. U-379 finally sank after being rammed four times.

Wolfpacks
U-379 took part in two wolfpacks, namely:
 Wolf (13 July – 1 August 1942)
 Steinbrinck (3 – 8 August 1942)

Fate
U-379 was sunk on 8 August 1942 in the North Atlantic southeast of Cape Farewell, Greenland, in position , by ramming and depth charges from the Royal Navy corvette . There were 40 dead and 5 survivors.

Summary of raiding history

Bibliography

Notes

Bibliography

External links

German Type VIIC submarines
1941 ships
U-boats commissioned in 1941
U-boats sunk in 1942
U-boats sunk by depth charges
U-boats sunk by British warships
World War II shipwrecks in the Atlantic Ocean
World War II submarines of Germany
Ships built in Kiel
Maritime incidents in August 1942